Douglas Mawson (1882–1958) was an Australian geologist and Antarctic explorer.

Mawson may also refer to:

 Mawson (surname)
 Mawson Station, Antarctic base named after Douglas Mawson
 Mawson Sea, Antarctic sea named after Douglas Mawson
 Mawson Coast, Antarctic coast
 Mawson's Huts, historic Antarctic site
 Mawson Trail, cycling trail in South Australia
 Electoral district of Mawson, electorate for the South Australian House of Assembly
 Mawson, Australian Capital Territory, suburb in Canberra
 Mount Mawson, mountain in the Mount Field National Park in Tasmania, Australia
 Antarctic cod, sometimes known as Mawson's cod
 Mawson (state), a historic Shan state in present-day Burma
 SS Douglas Mawson, an Australian steamer that disappeared in a cyclone in 1923